Pukekura Park is a Garden of National Significance, covering 52 hectares near the heart of New Plymouth, Taranaki in New Zealand.

History
The gala opening of New Plymouth's 15 hectare Recreation Ground was held on 29 May 1876. During the day the first trees were ceremonially planted by Miss Jane Carrington, the daughter of surveyor Frederic Alonzo Carrington: an oak for Great Britain, a pūriri for New Zealand, a Norfolk Island pine for the South Pacific Islands and a Pinus radiata for America. The ceremonial spade used to plant the trees is held in the Puke Ariki collection in New Plymouth.

The park contains a diverse range of native and exotic plants.  Various easy walking trails cross the park and meander along the lake sides, taking in the features of the park. Among these are the picturesque Poet's Bridge, which was opened on 11 March 1884. There is also a man-made cascading waterfall and a fountain in the aptly named Fountain Lake.  Row boats can be hired for rowing on the main lake.

Sports and music
Pukekura Park is a popular events venue.

Cricket
At the north-western end of the park is a cricket ground, established in the 1880s which is noted for the beauty of its setting. The first game of cricket there was played in 1892.

After the team's visit to play a two-day game against Taranaki in January 1936, the Marylebone Cricket Club captain Errol Holmes wrote:
... when we went to the ground, we were struck with its beauty, and decided that it must be one of the most attractive that could be imagined. On three sides it was surrounded by high banks, giving it the facilities of a natural amphitheatre. The pavilion stood on the fourth side which, in turn, led out on to Pukekura Park, famous for its assortment of trees and banks of hydrangeas almost as big as houses, while, away to the south, rose the peak of Mount Egmont, snow-capped, serene and splendidly aloof.

The ground has hosted first-class cricket since the 1950–51 season, when the Central Districts cricket team was established and began playing some of its matches there. As of 2021, 55 men's first-class have been played on the ground, with the last match played in 2015. Central Districts men's and women's sides continue to use the ground in List A and Twenty20 cricket competitions.

The ground first hosted international cricket in 1982 when three Women's One Day International matches were played on the ground. A women's Test match was played on the ground in February 1992 and later in the same month a single men's international match, a One Day International in the 1992 Cricket World Cup, was played on the ground with Sri Lanka beating Zimbabwe in a high-scoring match by three wickets with four balls to spare. Zimbabwean Andy Flower scored a century during the match, making 115 not out. Three women's Twenty20 International matches were played on the ground between 2016 and 2018.

Today the park can only host domestic fixtures because of the small boundaries and lack of international standard facilities.

Other sports and events
In August 2021, domestic rugby returned to the venue for the first time in 79 years when host Taranaki defeated Hawke's Bay 33–19 in the National Provincial Championship in a one-off match. Other Taranaki home matches will be played at TET Stadium.

On the eastern side of the park is New Plymouth Raceway, a horse racing course. Between the racetrack and the park is TSB Stadium, a 4,500 seat multi-purpose indoor stadium which is home to the Taranaki Mountainairs basketball team of the New Zealand NBL.

Near the southern end of the park is the Bowl of Brooklands amphitheatre, which commonly hosts music events.  The annual WOMAD festival is held at Pukekura Park.

Serenity
Pukekura Park is also home to the popular Tea House on the Lake, which has been situated on the main lake since the 1930s.

Pukekura Park is the venue for the annual Festival of Lights, which runs for free every year from mid-December to early February. It has daytime and night time programmes of events for people of all ages, and the festival itself transforms the park into an illuminated wonderland every evening.

In 2007, Pukekura Park was the winner of the "Mayfair" spot in a nationwide competition for places on Hasbro's New Zealand edition of Monopoly.

References

External links 

 New Plymouth District Council website
 Friends of Pukekura Park
 Potted History of Pukekura Park, at the Puke Ariki website

Protected areas of Taranaki
New Plymouth
Parks in New Zealand
Sport in New Plymouth
Cricket grounds in New Zealand
Rugby union stadiums in New Zealand
Sports venues in Taranaki
1992 Cricket World Cup stadiums
Urban forests in New Zealand